Jeffrey L. Smith, a Washington, D.C. Metropolitan Police officer, shot himself on January 15, 2021, after he assisted the United States Capitol Police on January 6, during the response to the . A psychiatrist hired by Officer Smith's widow found that drastic changes in Smith's behavior after January 6 are evidence that the attack on the Capitol was the precipitating event leading to his suicide. On October 13, 2021, two United States Senators and several members of the House of Representatives called for the Mayor to award Line of Duty benefits to Officer Smith and his widow Erin Smith.  On March 7, 2022, Officer Smith's death was officially ruled line of duty by the District of Columbia.  After petition by his widow, the Court found that the "direct and sole" cause of Officer Smith's death were the injuries he received in the line of duty while responding to the Capitol riot on January 6, 2021.

Suicide and lawsuit
Smith, 35, shot himself in the head on the George Washington Memorial Parkway on January 15, 2021, the day he was supposed to return to duty. Smith's was the second of two reported police suicides to occur in the immediate aftermath of the storming of the Capitol, the other being that of the U.S. Capitol Police officer Howard Liebengood. In the months after the storming of the Capitol, it was generally reported that the deaths of five people who were present have, to varying degrees, been related to the event. Some members of Congress and press reports included these two suicides in the number of casualties, for a total of seven deaths.

Dr. Jonathan Arden, the former Chief Medical Examiner of the District of Columbia was hired by Smith's widow as part of her lawsuit to have her husband's suicide ruled "in the line of duty". His report stated that the "acute, precipitating event that caused the death of Officer Smith was his occupational exposure to the traumatic events he suffered on January 6, 2021".  On July 30, his attorney David P. Weber filed the opening brief in the attempt, on behalf of Smith's widow, to have his death ruled line of duty. Submitting this report as evidence, on August 13, Smith's widow sued two of his alleged assailants, claiming they caused a traumatic brain injury with a crowbar or a heavy walking stick, leading to his death. According to media reports, Smith's alleged attackers, named in the federal lawsuit were identified by an internet vigilante group that analyzed publicly available videos from the Capitol attack.

On October 17, 2021, NBC News reported that the Virginia Congressional delegation had written to the Washington, DC Mayor noting that Smith's death was causally related to the Capitol Riot, and urged her to grant line of duty death benefits to Officer Smith's widow Erin Smith. On March 7, 2022, after petition by Officer Smith's widow, Officer Smith's death was ruled line of duty, and it was found that the "sole and direct" cause of Officer Smith's death were the injuries he received at the United States Capitol on January 6, 2021. The D.C. Police and Firefighters’ Retirement and Relief Board Order stated:  "“Officer Smith sustained a personal injury on January 6, 2021, while performing his duties and that his injury was the sole and direct cause of his death."

According to Officer Smith's attorney David P. Weber, "This is the first time where someone who has suffered a brain injury, and an emotional injury, has been acknowledged as a line-of-duty death.  This will impact widows, widowers, children and parents of everyday heroes who have suffered these injuries in the line of duty." Officer Smith's widow is now seeking to have Officer Smith's name added to the National Law Enforcement Officer's Memorial.

Honors
On August 5, 2021, Jeffrey L. Smith, along with Capitol Police officers Brian Sicknick, Howard Liebengood and Billy Evans, was posthumously honored in a signing ceremony for a bill to award Congressional Gold Medals to Capitol Police and other January 6 responders. His name is noted in the text of the bill, and President Biden remarked on his death. On August 1, 2022, Congress passed the Public Safety Officers Support Act of 2022, sending the bill to the President to be signed into law. The bill's sponsor, Senator Tammy Duckworth, stated at passage that, "I want to take a moment to recognize the incredible courage, resilience, and strength of the late Officer Jeffrey Smith’s widow, Erin Smith, and his parents, Richard and Wendy Smith. Their collective determination and commitment to fixing an unjust system to prevent future families of the fallen from having to experience the emotional pain and financial harm resulting from the denial of a line-of duty death designation, played a pivotal role in the development and passage of the Public Safety Officer Support Act. I commend Erin, Richard and Wendy Smith for honoring the service of their loved one and hope that Officer Smith’s lasting legacy of spurring a long-needed change in the law provides them with comfort and confidence that his tragic loss was not in vain." The bill was signed into law by President Biden on August 16, 2022, forever changing how police mental health and brain injuries are regarded on the federal level.

On January 6, 2023, "for his extraordinary heroism, pure courage, and unwavering devotion to the nation," Smith was posthumously awarded the Presidential Citizens Medal by President Joe Biden.

See also
 Police officer safety and health

References

2021 deaths
American police officers
Deaths by person in Virginia
Deaths related to the January 6 United States Capitol attack
Suicides by firearm in Virginia
Presidential Citizens Medal recipients